Zamia portoricensis, the marunguey, is a species of plant in the family Zamiaceae. It is endemic to Susua State Forest region of western Puerto Rico.

References

portoricensis
Endemic flora of Puerto Rico
Critically endangered plants
Taxonomy articles created by Polbot